Herron Glacier is a glacier in Denali National Park and Preserve in the U.S. state of Alaska. It is the source of the Herron River. The name was given by A.H. Brooks of the U.S. Geological Survey to honor Lt. Joseph S. Herron, who mapped much of the region.

See also
 List of glaciers

References

Glaciers of Denali Borough, Alaska
Glaciers of Denali National Park and Preserve
Glaciers of Alaska